The Quaker Man may refer to:

The mascot of Guilford College
The logo of the Quaker Oats Company